Jacques François Poos (3 June 1935 – 19 February 2022) was a Luxembourgish politician.

Early life and education
Born in 1935, in Luxembourg, Poos was a trained economist and became a doctor of economics in 1961, when he graduated from the University of Lausanne.

Career in politics
Poos was a long-time member of the Luxembourg Socialist Workers' Party. Between 1964 and 1976, he was director and editor in Chief of the daily newspaper “Tageblatt” in Esch-sur-Alzette. In the same period he also became a member of the town council of Esch-sur-Alzette.

In July 1976, he was appointed Minister of Finance.  As the foreign minister of Luxembourg he held Presidency of the Council of the European Union for three half-year terms in 1985, 1991 and 1997. He was Deputy-Prime Minister and Minister of Foreign Affairs, Foreign Trade and Development, first in Jacques Santer’s (from 1984 to 1995), then in Jean-Claude Junckers’s cabinets (from 1995 to 1999).

In 1991, he was one of the negotiators of the Brioni Agreement that ended the ten-day war in Slovenia. In May of that year, upon disembarking from an airplane en route to beginning negotiations, he declared, "The hour of Europe has dawned."

European Parliament
In 1999, Poos left the government and was elected as a Member of European Parliament, where he sat on the Committee for Foreign Affairs, Human Rights, Common Security and Defence Policy, and was the draftsman for Cyprus’ accession into the EU. In 2003, he received an honorary doctor of law degree from Panteion University of Athens, Greece.

Retirement and death
In 2004, Poos retired from political life, but remained active as non-executive director in the boards of different national and international institutions and companies. He died on 19 February 2022, at the age of 86.

See also
Juncker-Poos Ministry (1995-1999)

References

External links

 Interview with Jacques F. Poos
 Interview with Jacques F. Poos
 Video interviews with Jacques F. Poos
 Dr. Jacques F. Poos - Global Foreign Policy Today, an unconventional approach

|-

|-

|-

|-

|-

1935 births
2022 deaths
Ministers for Finances of Luxembourg
Deputy Prime Ministers of Luxembourg
Ministers for the Economy of Luxembourg
Ministers for Foreign Affairs of Luxembourg
Ministers for Defence of Luxembourg
Ministers for the Police Force of Luxembourg
Members of the Chamber of Deputies (Luxembourg)
Members of the Chamber of Deputies (Luxembourg) from Sud
Luxembourg Socialist Workers' Party politicians
People from Luxembourg City
Luxembourg Socialist Workers' Party MEPs
Luxembourgian bankers
MEPs for Luxembourg 1999–2004
Alumni of the Athénée de Luxembourg